Tecolote is one of several Spanish-language words meaning owl. The word is of Nahuatl origin and is used mostly in Mexico and in areas of the United States colonized by Spain. 

Tecolote refers to:
Tecolote, New Mexico, United States.
Tecolote (crater), a crater on Mars.
Tecolote Beach, a beach community in La Paz, Baja California Sur, Mexico. 
Tecolote Barbudo, the bearded screech owl of Mexico.
Tecolotes de los Dos Laredos, a minor league baseball team, based in Nuevo Laredo, Tamaulipas, Mexico and Laredo, Texas, United States.
Tecolotito, New Mexico, a community in San Miguel County, New Mexico, United States.  
Chukut Kuk, Arizona, also known as Tecolote.